The Embassy of the State of Palestine to the Holy See is the diplomatic mission of the Palestine in the Vatican. It was opened on 14 January 2017. It is located in an office building overlooking Vatican City.

The Palestinian ambassador to the Holy See is Issa Kassissieh.

See also

List of diplomatic missions of Palestine.

References

Diplomatic missions of the State of Palestine
Holy See–State of Palestine relations
Diplomatic missions in Rome to the Holy See